The pétanque competitions at the 2019 Southeast Asian Games in Philippines were held at the Royce Hotel and Casino at the Clark Freeport Zone in Mabalacat, Pampanga between 2 and 6 December 2019.

Medal table

Medalists

Men

Women

References

External links
 

2019 Southeast Asian Games events
Pétanque at the Southeast Asian Games